The Righteous Mind: Why Good People are Divided by Politics and Religion is a 2012 social psychology book by Jonathan Haidt, in which the author describes human morality as it relates to politics and religion.

In the first section, Haidt demonstrates that people's beliefs are driven primarily by intuition, with reason operating mostly to justify beliefs that are intuitively obvious. In the second section, he lays out his theory that the human brain is organized to respond to several distinct types of moral violations, much like a tongue is organized to respond to different sorts of foods. In the last section, Haidt proposes that humans have an innate capacity to sometimes be "groupish" rather than "selfish".

Summary
In the first part of the book, Jonathan Haidt uses cross-sectional research to demonstrate social intuitionism, how people's beliefs come primarily from their intuitions, and rational thought often comes after to justify initial beliefs. He cites David Hume and E. O. Wilson as thinkers who gave reason a relatively low estimation, as opposed to more popular thinkers who give reason a central place in moral cognition, such as Lawrence Kohlberg and his stages of moral reasoning.

In the second portion of the book, he presents moral foundations theory, and applies it to the political beliefs of liberals, conservatives, and libertarians in the US. Haidt argues that people are too quick to denigrate other points of view without giving those views full consideration, and attempts to reach common ground between liberals and conservatives. He makes the case in the book for morality having multiple foundations (more than just harm and fairness), and said in an interview that morality "is at least six things, and probably a lot more than that" and "[religion and politics are] ... expressions of our tribal, groupish, righteous nature." In his book, he compares the six aspects that people use to establish morality and take into consideration when making judgment to six taste receptors in the mouth. These aspects of morality are defined as care/harm, fairness/cheating, loyalty/betrayal, authority/subversion, sanctity/degradation,  and liberty/oppression. He goes on to establish that Republicans and Democrats tend to focus on different morality receptors and this leads to worse political tactics and decision making. Haidt himself acknowledges that while he has been a liberal all his life, he is now more open to other points of view.

In the third part of the book, Haidt describes a hypothetical "hive switch", which turns a selfish human "chimp" into a "groupish" human "bee". He describes how cultures and organizations have techniques for getting people to identify with their groups, such as dancing, moving, and singing in unison.

Key concepts and scholars discussed
 Rationalist delusion (p. 103)
 Social intuitionism
 Moral foundations theory
 Jean Piaget and developmental psychology
 Moral development and works by:
Lawrence Kohlberg
 Elliot Turiel
 Richard Shweder on cultural anthropology
 Humean philosophy
 Platonic philosophy
 Steven Pinker on human nature (The Blank Slate)
 E.O. Wilson:
 Consilience
Sociobiology: The New Synthesis
 Antonio Damasio and Descartes' Error
Howard Margolis on psychology
 Philip E. Tetlock on accountability
 Dan Ariely on Predictably Irrational
 Dan P. McAdams on personalities
 Religion
 critiques by Richard Dawkins and Daniel Dennett
David Sloan Wilson and Darwin's Cathedral
 Barbara Ehrenreich and Dancing in the Streets

Reception

The book was #6 on The New York Times Best Seller list for non-fiction in April 2012.

Journalistic reception
William Saletan wrote in The New York Times in 2012 that the book is "a landmark contribution to humanity’s understanding of itself".

The book received two reviews in The Guardian: in 2012, Ian Birrell called the book a "compelling study of the morality of those on the left and right [that] reaches some surprising conclusions"; and in 2013 Nicholas Lezard wrote that he was "in the odd position of being wary of a book I am also recommending. It's entertaining, snappily written and thought-provoking. It might even help Labour win the next election. But it still doesn't explain the gang running the country at the moment [the UK Conservative Party]."

Journalist Chris Hedges wrote a review of The Righteous Mind in 2012 in which he accused Haidt of supporting social Darwinism.

Academic reviews

See also
 Big Five personality traits
 Evolutionary psychology
 Moral psychology

References

External links
 
 TED Talk: The Moral Roots of Liberals and Conservatives

2012 non-fiction books
Books about evolutionary psychology
Books about social psychology
Books about the politics of science
Books in political philosophy
Contemporary philosophical literature
English-language books
Moral psychology books
Political philosophy literature
Works by Jonathan Haidt
Pantheon Books books